is a Japanese developmental biologist known for his pioneer research on Activin. He is Professor Emeritus of the University of Tokyo and Yokohama City University. He is also Vice President of the Tokyo University of Science.

Contribution
Asashima and his colleagues identified Activin in 1990, which exhibits a wide range of biological activities including regulation of cellular proliferation and differentiation.

Biography
Asashima was born in Sado, Niigata in 1944. He graduated from Tokyo University of Education in March 1967, and received his Ph.D. from The University of Tokyo in 1972. He was a postdoctoral fellow under Heinz Tiedemann at Free University of Berlin between 1972 and 1974, and a member of the faculty of Yokohama City University between 1972 and 1993, before being appointed as a professor at The University of Tokyo in 1993.

Recognition
1994: Kihara Memorial Foundation Academic Award (Japan)
2001: Imperial Prize of the Japan Academy (Japan)
2008: Person of Cultural Merit (Japan)
2008: Erwin-Stein-Preises (Germany)

References

External links
AIST profile

1944 births
Living people
People from Sado, Niigata
Developmental biologists
Japanese biologists
Academic staff of Yokohama City University
Academic staff of the University of Tokyo
University of Tokyo alumni
Laureates of the Imperial Prize
Persons of Cultural Merit